Vy is a transport operator in Norway.

Vy or VY may also refer to:

In transportation
VY, the speed for the best rate of climb in aviation
Lion-Peugeot Types VY and VY2, French cars produced between 1908 and 1909
Holden Commodore (VY), an executive car produced by Australian manufacturer Holden from 2002 to 2004
Formosa Airlines (IATA code VY), a domestic airline from 1966 to 1999
Vueling (IATA code VY), a Spanish low-cost airline founded in 2004

People
Lê Nguyên Vỹ (1933–1975), South Vietnamese brigadier general
Nguyễn Văn Vy (born 1916), South Vietnamese lieutenant general, Chief of Staff of the Army and Defense Minister

Other uses
Vy, Burkina Faso, a town
VyOS, a Linux-based network operating system
University of Vaasa (Vaasan yliopisto), Finland
Vermont Yankee Nuclear Power Plant, Vernon, Vermont, United States
VY Canis Majoris, an enormous star
VY Piscium or HR 515, a variable star

See also
Viy (disambiguation)